The Doerner Fir, also known as the Brummitt Fir, is a record-setting Coast Douglas-fir (Pseudotsuga menziesii var. menziesii) in Oregon, is one of the tallest known trees in the world which is not a redwood (Sequoioideae), at . 

It is approximately the same height as Centurion, a specimen of Eucalyptus regnans located in southern Tasmania, and as the tallest known specimen of Yellow meranti found in Borneo.

The tree grows in a Bureau of Land Management (BLM) forest in Coos County. The tree was previously named the Brummitt Fir after its drainage until it was renamed in honor of Ray Doerner, a Douglas County commissioner and longtime BLM employee.

See also 
 List of tallest trees
 List of individual trees
 List of superlative trees

References

Coos County, Oregon
Individual trees in Oregon
Individual Douglas firs